Huang Jianhong (8 February 1931 – 15 March 2021) was a lieutenant general in the People's Liberation Army of China. He was a delegate to the 7th and 8th National People's Congress.

Biography
Huang was born Dong Feng in Luan County (now Luanzhou), Hebei, on 8 February 1931. He enlisted in the People's Liberation Army (PLA) in July 1946, and joined the Chinese Communist Party (CCP) in August 1950.

After establishment of the Communist State, in 1950, he became a doctor of the Health Department of the 190th Division during the Korean War. He was political commissar of the PLA Dalian Army Academy in May 1986, and held that office until April 1990, when he was appointed director of the Political Department of the Shenyang Military Region. In October 1992, he was promoted to become deputy commander of the military region, a position he held until December 1994. 

On 15 March 2021, he died in Shenyang, Liaoning, at the age of 90.

He was promoted to the rank of major general (shaojiang) in September 1988 and lieutenant general (zhongjiang) in July 1993.

References

1931 births
2021 deaths
People from Luanzhou
Jilin University alumni
People's Liberation Army generals from Hebei
Delegates to the 7th National People's Congress
Delegates to the 8th National People's Congress